William Henry Walton (3 September 1894 – 24 July 1953) was an Australian rules footballer who played with Collingwood in the Victorian Football League (VFL).

Walton started his career at Victorian Football Association (VFA) club Port Melbourne and was their leading goal-kicker in 1914. When the VFA went into recess due to WWI, Walton agreed to captain South Melbourne District in the VJFA for 1916.
Enticed to join Collingwood in 1918, Walton appeared in Grand Finals in both his seasons with Collingwood.  He played centre half forward in the 1918 VFL Grand Final loss to South Melbourne and centre half back in the 1919 premiership team.

Walton returned to Port Melbourne in 1920 and was appointed captain-coach of Hawthorn (then playing in the VFA) in 1922. He was however refused a clearance by Port Melbourne and as a result spent the season playing for them, while coaching Hawthorn during the week. Twice that season, he had the unusual situation of playing a VFA game against the club that he coached. In one of those matches a Port Melbourne teammate had to be restrained from striking Walton over Walton's vocal support for the player's opponent. In 1923 he was granted his clearance and steered Hawthorn into the finals.

In 1925 he accepted a position to captain-coach Stawell in the Wimmera District Football League. He led the team to a premiership but left town the following year. Walton became the captain-coach of the Castlemaine Football Club for 3 years before moving to Albury and coaching East Albury in the Ovens and Murray Football League.

In 1930 he retired as a player and took up being the licensee for the Rising Sun Hotel in South Melbourne. Later on he was the licensee of the Sir Henry Loch Hotel in Collingwood.
 He died after a short illness leaving a wife and a daughter and a son.

References

Sources
 Atkinson, G. (1982) Everything you ever wanted to know about Australian rules football but couldn't be bothered asking, The Five Mile Press: Melbourne. .
 Holmesby, Russell and Main, Jim (2007). The Encyclopedia of AFL Footballers. 7th ed. Melbourne: Bas Publishing.

External links

 

1894 births
Collingwood Football Club players
Collingwood Football Club Premiership players
Port Melbourne Football Club players
Hawthorn Football Club (VFA) players
Hawthorn Football Club (VFA) coaches
Stawell Football Club players
Castlemaine Football Club players
Australian rules footballers from Melbourne
1953 deaths
One-time VFL/AFL Premiership players
People from Abbotsford, Victoria